Kaltix Corp., commonly known as Kaltix, was a personalized search engine company founded at Stanford University in June 2003 by Sep Kamvar, Taher Haveliwala, and Glen Jeh. It was acquired by Google in September 2003.

Description
Kaltix is a startup company, formed to commercialize personalized web search technology utilizing a set of proprietary algorithms. The company developed a system to speed up the computation of Google's PageRank algorithm and personalize search results by sorting them according to the interests of the individual instead of the consensus approach developed by Google. It was claimed by the founders of the company that the algorithm offered a way to compute search results nearly 1,000 times faster than what was possible using current methods in 2003.

History
Kaltix is based on the work of Sep Kamvar, Taher Haveliwala and Glen Jeh when they were members of the PageRank Project at Stanford University as graduate students in 2002 to 2003. Their aimed to advance the PageRank algorithm developed by Larry Page and Sergey Brin, the co-founders of Google. Their efforts resulted in the development of three algorithms: Quadratic Extrapolation, BlockRank and Adaptive PageRank. Together, they formed the foundation of Kaltix.

The first of these algorithms were presented in a paper to the 12th International World Wide Web Conference (WWW 2003) in Budapest, Hungary on May 22, 2003. Kaltix Corp was founded a short time later on June 16, 2003; the same day the trio published their business plan and purchased the Kaltix domain name. By August 2003, the company's PageRank system, which was designed to show results based on the individual preferences of the user, was rumored soon to outrank Google's consensus approach. Just three months after the company's founding, Kaltix was acquired by Google for an undisclosed sum, on September 30, 2003.

Reception
Kaltix was initially met with excitement and mystery by both technology writers (including The New York Times) and the technology industry as a whole. Enthusiasm for the potential of personalized Google search results up to five times faster was accompanied by speculation due to the little information known about the company at the time. Since its founding and acquisition by Google, Kaltix has been noted for its importance and its impact in the area of personalized search.

References

External links
 Sep Kamvar's Personal Website
 Taher Haveliwala's Personal Website
 Glen Jeh's Personal Google Site 

Companies established in 2003
Internet search engines
Google
Google acquisitions